Samantha Haggo (born 4 November 1992) is a Scottish cricketer. She played in four matches for the Scotland women's national cricket team in the 2015 ICC Women's World Twenty20 Qualifier in November and December 2015. In May 2019, she was named in Scotland's squad for the 2019 ICC Women's Qualifier Europe tournament in Spain. She made her Women's Twenty20 International (WT20I) for Scotland against the Netherlands on 26 June 2019.

References

External links
 

1992 births
Living people
Scottish women cricketers
Scotland women Twenty20 International cricketers
Place of birth missing (living people)